Dipterocarpus dyeri (Khmer: rôyiëng, chhë tiël pruhs, chhë tiël th'nô:r, local name Kompong Thom: chhieutiel chgor, name used for commercial timber and the group of trees harvested for such: keruing, Vietnamese: Dầu Song Nàng, is a species of tree in the family Dipterocarpaceae found in Myanmar, Thailand, Peninsular Malaysia (Kedah, Perlis), Cambodia and Vietnam. The tree is found in rain forest and lowland semi-evergreen dipterocarp forests, an alternative habitat description is mixed dense forests of the plains, mainly among rivers and valleys. The tree is a climax or late successional species, which in some secondary forests forms relatively young pure colonies.
The conservation status is based on rates of habitat loss, the major threat to the taxa, though in Vietnam it is cited as having a less threatened conservation status of Vulnerable.

In Cambodia the wood is classified as of the 2nd best category, and is in great demand for house and boat construction.

The following insects are associated with and prey on the seed of D. costatus: Alcidodes, particularly Alcidodes crassus, Pempelia, Salebria, Dichocrocis, Andrioplecta  pulverula, and Andrioplecta shoreae.

References

Further reading

Ashton, P.S., 1990, Annotations to: conservation status listings for Dipterocarpaceae
Aubréville, A. et al., eds., 1960–, Flore du Cambodge du Laos et du Viet-Nam,
FAO Regional Office for Asia and the Pacific, 1985, Dipterocarps of South Asia, FAO, Bangkok
Lanessan, Jean Marie Antoine de, 1886, Pl. util. colon. franç: 297
Loc, P.K., 1992, Annotations to: Conservation status listing for Philippines dated 6 April 1992
Oldfield, S., C.Lusty & A.MacKinven, compilers, 1998, The World List of Threatened Trees, World Conservation Press, Cambridge, England
Smitinand, T., 1958, Identification keys to genera and species of the Dipterocarpaceae of Thailand, Royal Forest Dept.
Soerianegara, I., & R.H.M.J.Lemmens, eds, 1993, Timber trees: major commercial timbers, In: Faridah Hanum, I., & L.J.G.van der Maesen, eds., Plant Resources of South-East Asia (PROSEA). (Pl Res SEAs) 5(1):178.
van Steenis, Cornelis Gijsbert Gerrit Jan, 1948, Flora Malesiana, Flora Malesiana Foundation, Leiden
Whitmore, T.C., 1990, Comments on draft listing of tropical timbers of Peninsular Malaysia

dyeri
Trees of Indo-China
Trees of Peninsular Malaysia
Plants described in 1886